The 2019 Eastbourne District Council election took place on 2 May 2019 to elect members of Eastbourne Borough Council in England. This was on the same day as other local elections.

Summary

Election result

|-

Ward Results

A * denotes an incumbent councillor seeking re-election.

Devonshire

Hampden Park

Langney

Meads

Old Town

Ratton

St Anthony's

Sovereign

Upperton

By-elections

Hampden Park

Sovereign

St. Anthony's

References 

2019 English local elections
Eastbourne Borough Council elections
2010s in East Sussex
May 2019 events in the United Kingdom